ValNet is an association of Valencian pilota professional players.

In 2005 the retired pilotaris Alfred Hernando (Fredi), Daniel Ribera (Ribera II) and the trinquet owner Emili Peris, joined to create a brand new company that professionalized this old sport's environment: Assured minimal fees for the players, physical preparation, a number of weekly matches for everyone, levelled competitions and challenging exhibitions for bettings. This all has cleaned up and revitalized Valencian pilota world but has also carried some criticism because of alleged favours to certain players and trinquets.

List of ValNet pilotaris

Professional players 
 Adrián I
 Adrián II
 Álvaro
 Aucejo
 Canari
 Cervera
 Colau
 Dani de Benavites
 Espínola
 Fèlix
 Genovés II
 Grau
 Héctor
 Herrera
 Javi
 Jesús
 León
 Melchor
 Mezquita
 Miguel
 Nacho
 Núñez
 Oñate
 Pedro
 Pere
 Primi
 Raül II
 Salva
 Santi
 Sarasol II
 Solaz
 Soro III
 Tato
 Tino
 Víctor
 Voro

Feridors players 
 Miguelín
 Oltra
 Pedrito

Relevant competitions 
 Escala i corda
Circuit Bancaixa
Trofeu Individual Bancaixa

References

External links 
 Webpage, 
 Players of the ValNet firm

Valencian pilota